The British Institute of Recruiters - BIoR is a United Kingdom (UK) based international professional body for recruiters and human resources professionals.  Founded as the Institute of Recruiters (IOR) by British entrepreneur Azmat Mohammed and incorporated in the United Kingdom in February 2011, the organization was renamed the British Institute of Recruiters in 2017.

Global organisation 
The British Institute of Recruiters is headquartered in the UK but has a sister organisation (American Institute of Recruiters) based in Delaware, United States.  Both organizations act as a route to export British recruitment standards internationally, and help promote the United Kingdom as the world's foremost and advanced authority within the recruitment and HR specialisms.

UK launch 
In the UK, the organization adopts a code of conduct for recruiters that is in line with government standards regulated by the Employment Agencies Standards Inspectorate (EAS), an executive division of the Department for Business, Innovation and Skills (BIS). By doing so both members and non-members are required to abide by its code to avoid breaching UK laws and regulations.

Standards 
The British Institute of Recruiters has developed a set of open global recruitment and HR standards for the recruitment and HR professions, supported by an international alliance of industry sector partners. A core aim of the BIoR is to promote British recruitment standards as 'World Leading', and the benchmark of professionalism for the global industry.

Partnerships 
The British Institute of Recruiters has created several partnerships to allow recruiters to experience an array of services from the recruitment and HR industry elite.

Lobbying 
As part of its international remit, the institute has been lobbying government in order to bring about changes to laws related to HR practitioners and recruiters.

References 

 http://www.hrzone.co.uk/topic/recruitment/institute-recruiters-launched/111851
 http://www.onrec.com/news/launch_of_institute_of_recruiters_ior_ma
 https://web.archive.org/web/20120122122326/http://www.personneltoday.com/articles/2011/06/09/57702/institute-of-recruiters-ready-to-bare-its-teeth.html
 http://www.hrmagazine.co.uk/hro/news/1019212/institute-recruiters-signs-partnership-hr-insight

External links 
 http://www.theior.org.uk

Recruitment